Mykhalchenko is a Ukrainian patronymic surname that derives from the first name Myhailo (Ukrainian equivalent of Michael). Its Russian-language spelling is Mikhalchenko.

The surname may refer to:
Larisa Mikhalchenko, Ukrainian discus thrower
Iryna Mykhalchenko, Ukrainian high jumper
Alla Mikhalchenko (born 1957), Soviet ballerina, Bolshoi Theatre

See also
 

Ukrainian-language surnames
Patronymic surnames